Sir Antony George Anson Fisher   (28 June 1915 – 8 July 1988), nicknamed AGAF, was a British businessman and think tank founder. He participated in the formation of various libertarian organisations during the second half of the twentieth century, including the Institute of Economic Affairs and the Atlas Network. Through Atlas, he helped establish up to 150 other institutions worldwide.

Early life
Antony Fisher was born on 28 June 1915. He was only two years old when his father was killed by a sniper in Gaza during World War I.

He was educated at Eton College. He graduated from Trinity College, Cambridge with a degree in engineering. During the Second World War, he served as a fighter pilot in the Royal Air Force, being awarded the Air Force Cross.

Career

After World War II, he was alarmed by the election of a Labour government, the nationalisation of industry, and the introduction of central economic planning. In 1945, Fisher had read The Road to Serfdom by Austrian economist F. A. Hayek which influenced his thinking. Fisher sought out Hayek at the London School of Economics (where he taught) and talked about his plans to go into politics. Hayek, however, convinced him that think-tanks were the best medium for effecting political change.

In 1952, he undertook a study trip to the United States, where he visited the new Foundation for Economic Education (FEE). F. A. Harper of the FEE introduced Fisher to former colleagues from the Agriculture Department of Cornell University in Ithaca, New York, who showed him intensive chicken farming techniques. Fisher was very impressed and returned to start England's first battery cage chicken farm, Buxted Chickens, which eventually made him a millionaire.

In 1955, he used his fortune to set up the influential Institute of Economic Affairs with Ralph Harris.

Some of Fisher's other business ventures did not succeed (including a turtle-farming operation).

In 1971 Fisher founded the International Institute for Economic Research, which went to spawn both the Atlas Network in 1981 and the International Policy Network in 2001. Through these operations, Fisher provided financial and operational support for a huge number of fledgling think-tanks, most of which would not exist without his influence. It was through the Atlas Network that Fisher was able to extend his beliefs worldwide. By 1984, Fisher was watching over eighteen institutions in eleven countries. As of 2017, Atlas supports and works with nearly 500 free-market think-tanks in over 90 different countries.

In his book Thinking the Unthinkable, Richard Cockett sketched Fisher's role in supporting other emerging think-tanks around the world. Cockett wrote, "On the strength of his reputation with the IEA, he was invited in 1975 to become co-director of the Fraser Institute in Vancouver, founded by the Canadian businessman T. Patrick Boyle in 1974. Fisher let the young director of the Fraser Institute, Dr Michael Walker, get on with the intellectual output of the Institute (just as he had given free rein to Seldon and Harris at the IEA) while he himself concentrated on the fund-raising side". Cockett explained that after his success at the Fraser Institute, Fisher went to New York where in 1977 he set up the International Center for Economic Policy Studies (ICEPS), later renamed the Manhattan Institute. "The incorporation documents for the ICEPS were signed by prominent attorney Bill Casey, later Director of the Central Intelligence Agency". Cockett comments that "under the directorship of William Hammett the Manhattan Institute became probably Fisher's greatest success after the IEA".

In 1977, Cockett wrote, Fisher moved to San Francisco "with his second wife Dorian, who he had met through the Mont Pelerin Society, and founded the Pacific Research Institute in 1979" and Fisher and Milton Friedman lived in the same apartment block in San Francisco during the 1980s. In the late 1970s, Fisher assisted Greg Lindsay in the development of the Centre for Independent Studies in Sydney. Cockett wrote, "In 1981, to co-ordinate and establish a central focus for these institutes that Fisher found himself start up all over the world, he created the Atlas Economic Research Foundation which in 1987 joined up with the Institute for Humane Studies (IHS) (founded by the Mont Pelerin member F. A. Harper in 1961) to provide a central institutional structure for what quickly became an ever-expanding number of international free-market think-tanks or research institutes". According to Cokett, "Fisher used the local and international gatherings of the Mont Pelerin Society to find personnel, fund-raisers and donors for many of the Atlas Institutes" as the international think-tanks proliferated.

He was a co-founder of the Fraser Institute, the Manhattan Institute, the Pacific Research Institute, the National Center for Policy Analysis, the Centre for Independent Studies, and the Adam Smith Institute.

He was knighted four weeks before his death.

Personal life
He was married twice. He had four children with his first wife, including Linda Whetstone, who was involved with many of Fisher's think tanks. His granddaughter, Rachel Whetstone, serves as senior vice-president of communications and public policy for Uber.

His second wife, Dorian Fisher, was George N. Crocker's widow.

Death
He died on 8 July 1988 in San Francisco, California.

References

Bibliography
 Cockett, Richard (1995). Thinking the Unthinkable: Think-Tanks and the Economic Counter-Revolution, 1931–1983. Fontana Press. .
 Kwang, Jo (2008). "Fisher, Antony (1915–1988)". In Hamowy, Ronald (ed.). The Encyclopedia of Libertarianism. Thousand Oaks, CA: Sage; Cato Institute. p. 177. . . . .

External links
 John Blundell, "Hayek, Fisher and The Road to Serfdom in Friedrich A. Hayek, The Road to Serfdom: the condensed version of the Road to Serfdom by F.A. Hayek as it appeared in the April 1945 edition of Reader's Digest, Institute of Economic Affairs, 1999.
 John Blundell, Waging the War of Ideas, speech to the Heritage Foundation, January 1990
 Article by Adam Curtis about think tanks, featuring Antony Fisher from the BBC
  from the BBC

1915 births
1988 deaths
People educated at Eton College
Alumni of the University of Cambridge
British libertarians
British Christian Scientists
20th-century British economists
Recipients of the Air Force Cross (United Kingdom)
Royal Air Force officers
Royal Air Force pilots of World War II
20th-century English businesspeople
Member of the Mont Pelerin Society